Carlos Borja Morca (May 23, 1913 – November 25, 1992) was a Mexican basketball player who competed in the 1936 Summer Olympics.

Born in Guadalajara, Jalisco, he was part of the Mexican basketball team, which won the bronze medal. He played all six matches.

He represented Mexico in several tournaments. He won in, among others, Juegos Panamericanos y del Caribe and Los juegos Centroamericanos. He retired at age 23. After retiring from playing the sport he became a basketball coach in South America. Colombia was his favorite South American country. He died on November 25, 1992, in Guadalajara, Jalisco, Mexico.

References

External links
profile
XI JUEGOS OLIMPICOS BERLIN 1936 BRONCE | EQUIPO DE BALONCESTO 

1913 births
1992 deaths
Basketball players at the 1936 Summer Olympics
Mexican men's basketball players
Olympic basketball players of Mexico
Olympic bronze medalists for Mexico
Sportspeople from Guadalajara, Jalisco
Olympic medalists in basketball
Basketball players from Jalisco
Medalists at the 1936 Summer Olympics